The Hanna-Barbera Hall of Fame: Yabba Dabba Doo II is a 1979 live-action/animated television special produced by Hanna-Barbera Productions which aired on CBS on October 12, 1979. It is a sequel to the 1977 special Yabba Dabba Doo! The Happy World of Hanna-Barbera.

Summary
Bill Bixby hosts a behind-the-scenes look at some of the most famous stars of the animated-cartoon world of Hanna-Barbera's "Hall of Fame" of animal heroes and villains and the careers of William Hanna and Joseph Barbera.

Cast
Bill Bixby – Host
Daws Butler – Various character voices

References

External links

1979 television specials
1970s American television specials
CBS original programming
CBS television specials
1970s animated television specials
Hanna-Barbera
Hanna-Barbera television specials
The Flintstones television specials
Yogi Bear television specials
Huckleberry Hound specials
Scooby-Doo specials
Television shows directed by Robert Guenette
Works with live action and animation